Defenestration were a UK nu metal band from 1999 to 2004, based in the Northamptonshire town of Kettering.

Career 
In their short career the band managed to play over 300 shows across the UK and Europe touring with the likes of Raging Speedhorn, Will Haven, Lostprophets, Napalm Death, Earthtone9, Stampin' Ground, Biffy Clyro, Gutworm, Therapy? and Megadeth. Career highlights included the band's shows at 2001's Reading and Leeds Festivals as well as opening the Wembley Arena leg of the 2001 'Tattoo The Planet Tour' whose line-up also boasted such acts as Cradle of Filth, Biohazard and Slayer

Throughout 2000 and 2001 the band became regulars in the British music media with reviews and features appearing in magazines such as Kerrang!, Metal Hammer, Rock Sound, NME, Revolver and Q as well as being played on Mary Anne Hobbs' BBC Radio 1 show and the John Peel show. The band also recorded live sessions for BBC Radio 1 and London-based Total Rock Radio.

The band made brief appearances on television with their Stitch and Away or Dead music videos being rotated on MTV2 and Kerrang! TV. They were also the subject of an MTV2 documentary that followed the band around as they embarked on a short tour of schools and Universities – the first Metal band to do so.

The band's second album, Ray Zero, was released on October 13, 2003.

Lineup
 Gen Tasker (vocals) is now lead singer of Thracia.
 Jamie Thompson (guitar) went on to join Raging Speedhorn until their split in 2008 as well as taking on full-time guitar duties in his brothers Dave's band, I'm Fashion You're Victim.
 Robert Reeves (guitar) went on to form Gunning For Goliath with Scott Warner, but they disbanded in 2007.
 Scott Warner (bass) has since joined lux with ex-The Junket singer/bass player Stephen Rees and ex-Defenestration drummer Ben Gordelier.
 Kieran Brain (drums) joined Raging Speedhorn frontman Frank Reagan in forming an old skool rock band Motorcity Daredevils but left after a couple of years to pursue his love of funk drumming.

Former members
Former members include:
Stuart Bruce (drums 1999–2000) who went on to front indie band Sympathy State.
Stacey Maher AKA Stacey Chaos (drums 2000–2002) drummed for the punk rock band Black Skull Squadron.
Ben Gordelier (drums 2002) who has since drummed for the Mercury Prize nominated Maps and is now in lux with Scott Warner as well as indie band The Moons with Paul Weller keyboard player Andy Crofts.

Releases
The band's first two albums were released on Dreamcatcher Records (Spitfire Records in the US) Their split EP was released on Snapper Music and their final release, the mini album For Us It Ends When We Drown was released on Rising Records.

One Inch God (2001)
Year Of The Slug split EP with Scurge (2002)
Ray Zero (2003)
For Us it Ends When We Drown (2004)

One Inch God and Ray Zero were re-released across digital platforms in June 2020 via Secret Records Limited

See also
Defenestration

References

British nu metal musical groups
Musical groups established in 1999
Musical groups disestablished in 2004
1999 establishments in the United Kingdom